Ixtlahuacán is a city and seat of the municipality of Ixtlahuacán, in the Mexican state of Colima.

References

Populated places in Colima

de:Municipio Ixtlahuacán